Rodrigo Gabriel Rodríguez Dubovich (born 25 November 1995) is a Uruguayan footballer who plays as a goalkeeper for Cerrito in the Uruguayan Segunda División.

Career

Liverpool (Montevideo)
Rodríguez began his senior career with Montevideo-based Liverpool, progressing through the club's youth academy. In 2016, he served as a member of the under-20 team that finished runners-up in the U-20 Copa Libertadores. After starting goalkeepers Guillermo de Amores and Jorge Bava suffered injuries, Rodríguez made his senior league debut for the club, registering a clean sheet in a 0–0 draw with Miramar Misiones.

Juventud de Las Piedras
In July 2019, Rodríguez parted ways with Liverpool, and trialled with Primera División club Juventud. On 13 July 2019, he made his competitive debut for the club in a 2–2 draw with Danubio.

Cerrito
Ahead of the 2023 season, Rodríguez joined Cerrito. He made his debut for the club on 4 March 2023 in a 3–0 defeat to his former club Juventud.

Career statistics

Club

References

External links

1995 births
Living people
Uruguayan footballers
Liverpool F.C. (Montevideo) players
Juventud de Las Piedras players
Club Sportivo Cerrito players
Uruguayan Primera División players
Uruguayan Segunda División players
Association football goalkeepers
Footballers from Paysandú